Yanjin County is a county under the administration of the prefecture-level city of Xinxiang, in the north of Henan province, China.

Administrative divisions
As 2012, this county is divided to 3 towns and 5 townships.
Towns
Chengguan
Dongtun
Fengzhuang

Townships

Climate

References

 
County-level divisions of Henan
Xinxiang